Herman Braun-Vega (7 July 1933 in Lima — 2 April 2019 in Paris) was a Peruvian painter and artist.

Although his work has always been figurative, it was at first (before 1970) close to abstraction. It experienced a decisive turning point when the artist came to settle permanently in Paris in 1968. By being in contact with the works of the great masters of painting, Braun-Vega developed the art of pictorial quotation.  He decided not to limit his painting to aesthetic research, but to adopt a clear pictorial language accessible to non-specialists even though his works often have several levels of reading. His painting enriched with references to the history of art, often depicts characters, landscapes, fruits and vegetables from his native Peru. He asserts his mixed origins through a syncretic work, often very colorful, interspersed with political messages including transfers of press clippings. Some would say he's a committed painter. The artist, who had set himself as a policy not to paint for saying nothing, defines himself rather as a witness of his time who wants to activate the memory of the spectator. His artistic production is in line with the trends of New figuration (Nouvelle figuration) and Narrative figuration (Figuration narrative).

Biography

Family 
His father, Francisco Braun Weisbrod, was Jewish born in 1902 under the Austro-Hungarian Empire, in the city of Stuhlweissenberg (Székesfehérvár), currently in Hungarian territory. His mother, Armida Vega Noriega, was born in Iquitos, capital of the Peruvian Amazon.

Herman Braun-Vega was born in Lima. His older brother, Max (painter ), was born in February 1932. After Herman, three other siblings were born : Berti (architect and urban planner), Álex (designer) and Aurora (painter and draftsman).

His father bought art reproductions in Paris and had them framed in Peru. As a result, his brother Max was the first to want to become a painter. Herman wanted to do the same as his brother.

Education 
In 1950, Herman became the student of Carlos Quizpez Asín at the School of Fine Arts in Lima, where he studied for a year and a half. At the beginning of 1951, his brother Max (19), who signed Fernando Vega, decided to travel to Paris to be a painter. At the end of that year (1951), Herman, with only 18 years old, also moved to Paris to be a painter. Introduced by his brother to the poet Jean Sénac, he evolved as soon as he arrived in the Parisian artistic community in a privileged way as a resident of the Hôtel du Vieux-Colombier, then managed by Maria Manton and Louis Nallard. In Paris, he had for the first time the opportunity to see original works by great masters that he had only known until then through reproductions. From that moment he will continue his training as an autodidact, in contact with other artists, and by studying the works of the great masters of painting in museums.

Lima - Paris 
In October 1952 his son Eric was born from a temporary affair with a young Frenchwoman, Camille Mülder, model of the photographer Albert Monier, who regularly frequented Saint-Germain-des-Prés. Herman had to abandon painting and dedicate himself to interior design, working for Jean Royère on whose behalf he finds himself in charge of opening a decoration agency in Peru. In 1955 he returned to Lima, where he opened an agency with architect Juan Gunther. But soon, despite the success of the business, the need to paint arises again. In Lima, he meets Nicole Boussel, a young mother of two blond children. The blended family he forms with his son, Nicole and her two boys will be a recurring source of inspiration in the years 63 to 66. In 1965, his brother Fernando (Max) died in Ibiza of an overdose of heroin.

A Peruvian in Paris 
In November 1967, Herman returned to Paris with his son. There he met Lisbeth Schaudinn, a young German, a UNESCO official, who would become the woman of his life. With her, he visited the Picasso Museum in Barcelona in 1968. There he discovered, the series that the master dedicated to the meninas of Velázquez. This discovery marked a decisive turning point in his work. Lisbeth, his wife and model, provides Herman with logistical support that allows him to devote himself entirely to his art. Living in Paris, he did not forget Peru and made many round trips to Lima. The Peruvian press quickly echoes the success of the country's child with the Parisian critics. He exhibits in Paris, Lima, New York, Brussels... In the 1970s, from exhibitions to exhibitions, he developed new techniques and new themes that would enrich his future works. He travels a lot and his trips to Peru are so frequent that he gets a house built there. From the 1980s, his work resembles his life, shared between European culture and his Latin American origins.

Work 
In 1978 he began to paint portraits, especially of his painters friends whom he invited to participate in the gestation of his paintings: Vladimir Veličković (in 1978), Gilles Aillaud (in 1979), Erró (in 1978-1982), Wifredo Lam (in 1979), Jean Dewasne (in 1982), Stanley William Hayter (in 1983) and Gérard Fromanger (in 1984). He also painted numerous writers: Jorge Semprún, Alain Jouffroy, Julio Ramón Ribeyro, Alfredo Bryce Echenique and Jean-Michel Ribes.

His work shows off syncretism and artistic and cultural, ethnic and political miscegenation. It seeks to ignite the memory of the spectator - historical memory through the iconography of the great masters of Western painting, social and political memory, through the introduction of contemporary situations and also individual authentic memory.

The sociologist Zygmunt Bauman has qualified him as one of the most outstanding exponents of liquid art, in his work Liquid Life, together with Manolo Valdés and Jacques Villeglé.

References 

1933 births
2019 deaths
People from Lima
20th-century Peruvian painters
20th-century Peruvian male artists
21st-century Peruvian painters
21st-century male artists
Peruvian Jews
Peruvian people of Hungarian-Jewish descent
Peruvian male painters